Spliced is a Canadian animated television series produced by Nelvana in association with Teletoon that first aired from September 19, 2009 to March 13, 2010 in the United States.

Plot
Spliced is a modern take of H. G. Wells' 1896 science-fiction fantasy, The Island of Doctor Moreau. Spliced marginally distorts Wells' characters in this modern twist by making the mutants the result of genetic experiments created by recombinant DNA rather than Wells' original vivisection process. As with the original story, these experimental results, plus one platypus not in the original story, live on an isolated tropical island that is called "Keep Away Island" in the cartoon. The mad scientist who created them was arrested and removed by authorities via boat. Left to their own devices, these mutated beasts form a functional society.

Characters

 Peri (short for failed exPERIment number 13) is a mutant of a fox and an octopus. In the episode where Peri happens upon the lab notes concerning his creation, Entrée ends up using the pages as toilet paper before Smarty-Smarts can actually read them to determine Peri's purpose. Peri lives in a plane that crashed on the island. Peri is an expert bowler, and he and his best friend Entrée developed their trademark game, "bucket-stick-fruit-ball." Peri is voiced by Rob Stefaniuk.
 Entrée (named in reference to the main course of a meal) is Peri's best friend. Entrée was created as the perfect food animal, with a cow's udders, a pig body, a chicken's wings and comb, and a shrimp tail. Since he has no legs, Entrée "walks" on his teats, named Nugget, Pokey, Cranky, Commodore Uddersworth, Tina, A.J., Nippocles, and an unnamed eighth which Entrée darkly claims speaking its name "will give it power." Entrée's teats are capable of time travel and light show effects. Fittingly, his home is a giant pizza oven and his bed is a barbecue grill. Entrée is mostly evil, in the sense of always seeking instant self-gratification, no matter the cost. Much of the time Entrée's selfishness ends up causing more destruction than Mr. Smarty Smarts' intentional evil. Entrée is a glutton, loving to gorge on anything, even things that aren't normally edible, but especially mayonnaise. Entrée is voiced by Joe Pingue.
 Two-legs Joe is a two-legged rhinoceros out of whose high and pointy upper hindquarters a mostly silent bird character named Lord Wingus Eternum grows. Two-Legs Joe is the mayor of the town this society of mutants inhabits, which to his great frustration is constantly being wrecked, burned, and blown-up by the innocent yet highly destructive childlike behavior of Peri and Entrée, especially when they play in the doctor's abandoned laboratory. Joe's thing, since he has a  rhino's weight upon two massive legs, is stomping. Joe loves to stomp, and he loves to stomp Peri and Entrée, and especially Entrée, after they destroy his town. Wingus, perched on the high point of Joe's back end, is of the species that was the Doctor's "first, and also his best, creation," according to Wingus. It turns out that Two-Legs Joe is actually a mutant growth on Wingus' leg. Such are the hazards of messing with DNA. Two-legs Joe is voiced by Pat McKenna, and Wingus is voiced by Tom McCamus.
 Patricia is a female platypus that happened to live on Keep Away Island when the Doctor set up shop. She feels very lonely on Keep Away Island being the only creature that is not spliced. She is an author and has been shown writing a book of poetry as well as the novel: "Marzipan Meadows and the Kingdom of Adventure". She is a master of the martial art "Plat Kwon Do". Patricia is voiced by Katie Crown.
 Princess Pony Apehands has the head and tail of a pony onto the body of an ape. She is one of the more aggressive mutants, but because she has the mental capacity of a very young girl, she doesn't quite understand how big and strong she is and often hurts others when she is simply trying to play with them or give them a hug. She also has a rather short temper, and will intentionally hurt any mutant who angers her.  Her tree house is located deep in the forest and is completely pink inside, and she herself is colored pink and purple. She wears a ballet tutu and slippers and enjoys very girly things. Although she's a girl, her voice is quite masculine and deep. Princess Pony Apehands is voiced by Kedar Brown.
 Compuhorse is a horse with a computer implanted. He has very limited animation, for example: He cannot move his lips but speaks similarly to Stephen Hawking, with a synthesized voice through his keyboard. His best friend is Calcupony and his rival is AlphaDonkey. Compuhorse is voiced by Pat McKenna. In the virtual game "Cube Whacker" he's known as OmegaSteed. OmegaSteed is voiced by Mark Dailey.
 Fuzzy Snuggums is a small explorer seeking adventure beyond the island but always fails. He often begins talking with the phrase "Expedition note...". Long ago, Fuzzy was chosen by the doctor to combat against robots of another scientist from another island, but could not be stopped and was later reassigned for exploration. At that time, his opening sentence was "Execution note..." (demonstrated in the episode "Sgt Snuggums"). The Doctor made him indestructible, which is fortunate, considering his exploration attempts usually backfire upon him painfully. Though usually small and cute, Fuzzy's true form personality, which can resurface under extreme circumstances, is that of a giant, musclebound brawler. It was revealed by Lord Wingus in the episode "Stompabout", that were Joe to never get angry again, Fuzzy would rule the island, enslaving all of its occupants. Fuzzy is voiced by Julie Lemieux.
 Mister Smarty Smarts is a villainous combination of a dolphin, chimpanzee and a Jack Russell Terrier with a well-developed primate brain, and the main antagonist of the series who attempts to take over the island. He resides in a lair which is located on a slope of the volcano. He is quite egotistical, believing the rest of the island inhabitants to be fools. He also has some cross-dressing tendencies, often looking for an excuse to wear a dress. Mister Smarty Smarts is voiced by Mike Kiss.
 Octocat is a combination of a cat and an octopus, who is Mister Smarty Smarts' assistant/minion (although it is shown that they share a romantic relationship of some sort), whom he met after they both crashed their cars together. Unlike the other mutants, she cannot talk, conversing solely in meows, but the others are still able to understand her. Like Fuzzy, she too was created to be a super-soldier, and can also assume a musclebound fighting form.

Episodes

Broadcast
Spliced made its world premiere on Jetix in Latin America on April 20, 2009. The series aired in Canada on Teletoon, in the United States on Qubo, in Australia on ABC3, in the United Kingdom and Ireland on Nicktoons in Latin America on Disney XD, and in Sweden on Nickelodeon. The series began airing in the United States on Qubo on September 19, 2009, until the network dropped it from its lineup on October 24, 2009, though it returned on September 28, 2010 as part of its "Night Owl" block, before being discontinued on March 31, 2012. Beginning early in 2014, YTV began airing reruns on weekdays. In 2014, the series was added onto the "Always On" digital platform of Cartoon Network in the United States. It was removed in 2015. In Canada, it also aired on Cartoon Network.

References

External links

 Spliced  at Nelvana
Spliced at Teletoon (Wayback machine)
 

2010s Canadian animated television series
2010 Canadian television series debuts
2010 Canadian television series endings
Canadian children's animated comedy television series
Canadian children's animated fantasy television series
Television series by Nelvana
Television series by Corus Entertainment
YTV (Canadian TV channel) original programming
Teletoon original programming
Television series about mutants
The Island of Doctor Moreau
Television series set on fictional islands